Romeo is an Italian masculine given name. It arose from the Greek Ρωμαίος for a Roman citizen or a pilgrim to Rome. The popularity of the name is primarily due to Luigi da Porto naming his tragic hero Romeo Montecchi in his 1524 novel Giulietta e Romeo, 70 years later adapted by Shakespeare into the play Romeo and Juliet. People with this name include:

Romeo Acop (born c.1948), Filipino politician
Romeo Acquarone (1895–1980), Monegasque tennis player
Roméo Affessi (born 1984), Ivory Coast-born footballer
Romeo Alaeff (born 1970), American visual artist
Romeo Anaya (1946–2015), Mexican boxer
Romeo Antoniazzi (1862–1925), Italian violin maker
Romeo Bandison (born 1971), Dutch American-football defensive tackle
Roméo Beaudry (1882–1932), French Canadian author, composer, pianist and record producer
Romeo Beckham (born 2002), son of David and Victoria Beckham
Romeo Bégin (1895–?), Canadian (Ontario) politician
Romeo Benetti (born 1945), Italian football defender
Romeo Bertini (1893–1973), Italian long-distance runner
Romeo Bezușcu (born 1964), Romanian rugby player
Romeo Roy Blanchette (1913–1982), American Roman Catholic Bishop
Romeo T. Boisvert (1916–1981), American (Maine) Democratic politician
Romeo Bosetti (1879–1948), Italian-born French actor and screenwriter
Romeo Bragato (1859–1913), Italian-born Australian and New Zealand winemaker
Romeo A. Brawner (1935–2008), Filipino public official 
Romeo Brin (born 1973), Filipino boxer
Romeo Bunică (born 1974), Romanian football forward
Romeo Munoz Cachola (born 1938), Philippines-born American (Hawaii) politician
Roméo Calenda (born 1972), French football
Romeo Callejo Sr. (born 1937), Filipino Supreme Court Justice
Romeo Cascarino (1922–2002), American classical composer
Romeo Castelen (born 1983), Dutch football winger
Romeo Castellucci (born 1960), Italian theatre director, playwright and designer
Romeo Challenger (born 1950), Caribbean-born, British-based musician
Romeo Corbo (born 1952), Uruguayan football striker
Romeo Crennel (born 1947), American football coach
Romeo de la Cruz (born 1936), Filipino lawyer 
Roméo Dallaire (born 1946), Canadian senator, general, humanitarian and author
Romeo Diaz (born 1940s), Filipino film score composer
Romeo Doubs (born 2000), American football player
Romeo Elton (1817–1889), American academic and author
Romeo Fernandes (born 1992), Indian football winger
Romeo Filipović (born 1986), German-born Croatian football player
Roméo Fortin (1886–1953), Canadian (Quebec) politician
Romeo H. Freer (1846–1913), American (West Virginia) politician and Attorney General
Roméo Gagné (1905–1959), Canadian (Quebec) politician
Romeo Galán (born 1933), Argentine sprinter
Romeo Gigli (born 1949), Italian fashion designer
Romeo Gontineac (born 1973), Romanian rugby player 
Romeo A. Horton (1923–2005), Americo-Liberian banker
Romeo James (born 1958), Indian field hockey player
Romeo Jenebyan (born 1979), Armenian football midfielder
Romeo Johnson (born c.1970), American singer-songwriter, composer, and vocal coach
Romeo Jozak (born 1972), Croatian football player and coach
Romeo Kambou (born 1980), Burkinabé football striker
Romeo Kapudija (born 1970), American-Croatian race car driver
Romeo Kreinberg (born 1950s), American–German business executive
Romeo Lahey (1887–1968), Australian businessman, civil servant and conservationist
Romeo Lamothe (1914–1991), Canadian (Alberta) politician
Romeo Langford (born 1999), American basketball player
Roméo LeBlanc (1928–2009), Canadian journalist, politician, and statesman; Governor General of Canada 1995–99
Romeo Lemboumba (born 1980), Gabonese boxer
Roméo Lorrain (1901–1967), Canadian (Quebec) politician
Romeo Mancini (1917–2003), Italian painter and sculptor
Romeo Mathieu (1917–1989), Canadian trade unionist and progressive political activist
Romeo McKnight (born 1998), American football player
Romeo Menti (1919–1949), Italian footballer
Romeo Miller (born 1989), American rapper, actor, entrepreneur and model
Romeo Mitrović (born 1979), Bosnian-Herzegovinian football goalkeeper
Romeo Montenegro (born 1974), Filipino civil servant and nurse
Romeo Muller (1928–1992), American screenwriter and actor
Romeo Muradyan (born 1979), Armenian actor
Romeo Murga (1904–1925), Chilean poet, writer and translator
Romeo Nedelcu (born 1939), Romanian bobsledder
Romeo Nelson (1902–1974), American boogie woogie pianist
Romeo Neri (1903–1961), Italian gymnast
Romeo Niram (born 1974), Spanish painter
Romeo Okwara (born 1995), American football linebacker
Romeo Olea (1962–2011), Filipino radio commentator
Romeo Oliva (1889–1975), Italian admiral during World War II
Romeo Ortega (born 1954), Mexican-French computer scientist
Romeo Papini (born 1983), Italian football midfielder
Romeo Parkes (born 1990), Jamaican football striker
Romeo Pazzini (1855–1942), Italian sculptor, painter and ceramist
Roméo Phillion (1939–2015), Canadian person wrongfully convicted of murder
Romeo Rivera (born 1939), Filipino actor
Romeo Rivers (1907–1986), Canadian ice hockey player
Romeo Romanutti (1926–2007), Italian basketball player
Romeo Roselli (born 1980), American professional wrestler Johnny Roselli
Roméo Sabourin (1923–1944), Canadian soldier and spy during World War II
Romeo Sacchetti (born 1953), Italian basketball player and coach
Romeo Saganash (born 1961), Canadian Member of Parliament and Shadow Minister
Romeo Santos (born 1981), American bachata singer and songwriter Anthony Santos
Romeo Shahinas (born 1996), Albanian football midfielder
Romeo Sisti (fl. 1928), Italian rower
Romeo Stavarache (born 1962), Romanian mayor
Romeo Stodart (born 1977), Trinidad-born English pop rock musician
Romeo Sukhlian (born 1989), Indian football midfielder
Romeo Surdu (born 1984), Romanian footballer
Romeo Tabuena (1921–2015), Filipino painter and printmaker
Romeo Tan (born 1985), Singaporean actor
Romeo Tanaka (born 1973), Japanese video game designer
Romeo Tanghal (born 1945), Filipino comics artist
Romeo Tirone (born 1960s), American cinematographer and television director
Romeo Travis (born 1984), American-born Macedonian basketball player
Romeo Valentino (born 1968), American professional wrestler and promoter
Romeo Van Dessel (born 1989), Belgian football midfielder
Romeo Vasquez (1939–2017), stage name of Filipino actor Ricardo Sumilang
Romeo Vásquez Velásquez (born 1957), Honduran politician and brigadier general
Romeo Venturelli (1938–2011), Italian racing cyclist
Romeo Wouden (born 1970), Dutch footballer
Romeo Zhivikj (1962–2004), Serbian-Macedonian gangster
Romeo Zondervan (born 1970), Dutch football midfielder

Fictional characters
Romeo Montague, tragic hero of Romeo and Juliet
 Romeo Santana, a main character from The Steve Harvey Show
Romeo Smith, character from the Australian soap opera Home and Away
Romeo, one of the evil UniSols in Universal Soldier 2
Romeo Nightingale, a character from the British soap Hollyoaks

See also
Romeo (disambiguation)
Romeu, a Portuguese-language variant

References

Italian masculine given names
Romanian masculine given names